Glyptocrinus is an extinct genus of sea lily that lived from the Middle Ordovician to the Early Silurian (471.8 - 436.0 Ma). Its remains have been found in North America.

References

External links
Glyptocrinus in the Field Museum's Evolving Planet
Glyptocrinus in the Paleobiology Database

Monobathrida
Prehistoric crinoid genera
Ordovician crinoids
Silurian crinoids
Ordovician echinoderms of North America
Dapingian first appearances
Silurian extinctions
Paleozoic life of Ontario